Victor Kuhn LaMer (1895 – 1966) was an American chemist.

Life 

He was born in Leavenworth, Kansas on June 15, 1895. He was the son of Joseph Secondule LaMer and Anna
Pauline Kuhn.

On July 31, 1918, he married Ethel Agatha McGreevy. They had three daughters.

On September 26, 1966 he died suddenly and unexpectedly while in Nottingham, England to present a paper.

Career 

He obtained his AB degree from the University of Kansas in 1915.

Over the next two years, he did a number of jobs, which include a high school teacher, a student at the University of Chicago, and a research chemist at the Carnegie Institution of Washington.

In 1921, he obtained his PhD from Columbia University.

Honours 

He was elected a Fellow of the American Physical Society in 1931 and a Member of the National Academy of Sciences in 1948.

He was also a member of American Chemical Society.

References

External links 

 https://web.archive.org/web/20140505104744/http://web2.clarkson.edu/projects/chemistry/job/

1895 births
1966 deaths
20th-century American chemists
University of Kansas alumni
People from Leavenworth, Kansas
Columbia University alumni
University of Chicago alumni
Fellows of the American Physical Society
Members of the United States National Academy of Sciences